Amorpha fruticosa is a species of flowering plant in the legume family Fabaceae, known by several common names, including desert false indigo, false indigo-bush, and bastard indigobush. It is native to North America.

Description
Amorpha fruticosa is a perennial shrub. It grows as a glandular, thornless shrub which can reach  in height and spread to twice that in width. It is somewhat variable in morphology. The leaves are made up of many hairy, oval-shaped, spine-tipped leaflets. The inflorescence is a spike-shaped raceme of many flowers, each with a single purple petal and ten protruding stamens with yellow anthers. The fruit is a legume pod containing one or two seeds.

Distribution and habitat
The native range extends through much of the United States and south into Mexico. Its native habitats include stream and pond edges, open woods, roadsides and canyons. 

The species has escaped cultivation elsewhere and is present as an introduced species in Europe, Asia, and other continents. It is often cultivated as an ornamental plant, and some wild populations may be descended from garden escapes.

Chemistry
6'-O-β-D-glucopyranosyl-12a-hydroxydalpanol, a rotenoid, can be found in the fruits of A. fruticosa. Several members of the amorfrutin class of compounds have been isolated from the fruits. Amorfrutins as well as other secondary metabolites from A. fruticosa have displayed favorable bioactivities counteracting diabetes and the metabolic syndrome.

Ecology
It is a larval host to the clouded sulphur, gray hairstreak, hoary edge, Io moth, marine blue, silver-spotted skipper, and southern dogface. The plentiful seeds are a food source for  bobwhite quail. Both bees and butterflies use the flowers as a nectar source.

Cultivars
 'Albiflora', with white flowers
 'Crispa', with curled leaves
 'Lewisii', with narrow leaves
 'Pendula', with arching branches, forming a dome shape

References

External links

Jepson Manual Treatment
USDA Plants Profile

Amorpha fruticosa L. Medicinal Plant Images Database (School of Chinese Medicine, Hong Kong Baptist University)  

fruticosa
Flora of Eastern Canada
Plants described in 1753
Taxa named by Carl Linnaeus
Flora of the United States